Marcus Ehm (born 7 June 1972) a paralympic athlete from Germany competing mainly in category T44 sprint events and a politician.

Biography
Marcus competed in all the individual T44 sprint and relay events in the 2000 Summer Paralympics winning a silver in the 400m and bronze medals in the 200m and the 4 × 400 m.  At the 2004 Summer Paralympics he competed in the individual sprints, Germany not entering relay teams, but could not win any medals this time.

Since 2018 Ehm is mayor of Sigmaringen, his city of birth.

References

Paralympic athletes of Germany
Athletes (track and field) at the 2000 Summer Paralympics
Athletes (track and field) at the 2004 Summer Paralympics
Paralympic silver medalists for Germany
Paralympic bronze medalists for Germany
German male sprinters
Living people
Medalists at the 2000 Summer Paralympics
Paralympic medalists in athletics (track and field)
1972 births
Mayors of places in Baden-Württemberg
Sprinters with limb difference
Paralympic sprinters